The Post Office Engineering Union (POEU) was a trade union in the United Kingdom.  It represented engineering staff in the Post Office, mostly working in telecommunications.

History

The union was founded in 1915 when the Post Office Engineering and Stores Association and the Amalgamated Society of Telephone Employees merged, to form the Post Office Amalgamated Engineering and Stores Association.  In 1922, following the establishment of the Irish Free State, the union's Irish section split away to form the Irish Post Office Engineering Union.  In 1925, the Post Office Telegraph Mechanicians' Society joined the union.  However, by 1939, membership was only 39,000.

By 1983, the POEU was the twentieth largest union in the UK, with membership around 130,000.  In 1985, it merged with the Postal and Telecommunications Group of the Civil and Public Services Association, forming the National Communications Union.

Election results
The union sponsored Labour Party candidates in each Parliamentary election from 1966 onwards.

Leadership

General Secretaries
1915: Charles Howard Smith
1938: John Edwards
1947: Douglas Coward
1953: Charles Delacourt-Smith
1972: Bryan Stanley

Presidents
1915: E. W. Bennett
1921: H. A. Barclay
1924: E. W. Goodwin
1926: H. G. Hill
1933: C. T. Saunders
1934: E. W. Goodwin
1935: C. J. Connelly
1936: A. V. Games
1939: Ernie Power
1951: W. J. A. Hughes
1952: L. G. Fox
1955: W. J. Jones
1956: Stan Rosser
1970: John Scott-Garner

References

External links
Catalogue of the POEU archives, held at the Modern Records Centre, University of Warwick
Catalogue of the POESA archives, held at the Modern Records Centre, University of Warwick

 
Trade unions established in 1915
Trade unions disestablished in 1985
Defunct trade unions of the United Kingdom
Postal trade unions
1915 establishments in the United Kingdom